Lerd (also Romanized as Lard; also known as  Lert) is a  tourist village in Palanga Rural District of Shahrud District, Khalkhal County, Ardabil Province, Iran. At the 2006 census, its population was 2,827 in 640 households. The following census in 2011 counted 3,523 people in 926 households. The latest census in 2016 showed a population of 3,226 people in 983 households; it was the largest village in its rural district.

Weather 
In terms of climate, this village is located in the mountainous region and on the eastern slope of the high Agh Dagh mountain. For this reason, it has very cold weather in autumn and winter and moderate weather in spring and summer. So that in winter sometimes the air temperature reaches -30 degrees Celsius and in summer it reaches +30 degrees Celsius.

Tourist Attraction 
This village is considered the tourism pole of Khalkhal County. Among the souvenirs of this village are local women's clothes, dairy products, honey, walnuts, pears, and apples. The tomb of Imamzadeh Mohammad, the famous Sibieh Khani waterfall, and Kokhlan-Bar stone cave are located at the entrance of the village.

Souvenir 
High quality walnut is one of the most important products of Lerd tourist village. Pears, apples, cherries, sour cherry, plums and apricots, mineral water, medicinal plants, mountain honey, dairy products, fish and live animals are some of the other Lerd's souvenirs that you can buy from this village.

The most famous handicrafts of this village, we can mention the local dress for women (in Tati language: sheh shelwar), which expresses the historical identity of the people of Lerd village.

Gallery 

 Tageo

References 

Khalkhal County

Towns and villages in Khalkhal County

Populated places in Ardabil Province

Populated places in Khalkhal County

Tourist attractions in Iran

Tourist attractions in Ardabil Province

Lists of tourist attractions in Iran